Rex v. Chisser, Court of King's Bench (1678), T. Ryan 275, 83 Eng. Rep. 142, is a criminal case interpreting possession and criminal intent in larceny. A merchant handed merchandise to Chisser, who then haggled over the price then ran out of the shop with the merchandise without agreeing to a price. At the time, common law was that larceny required a trespass to acquire possession. Although the property was handed to Chisser, the court found that although the merchant gave physical possession to Chisser, the property was still in legal possession by the merchant because there was no completed contract for the transfer in that the price was still being negotiated, and the act of running proved the felonious intent.

References

Criminal case law
English law articles needing infoboxes